Cable Beach is a  stretch of white sand beach on the eastern Indian Ocean and the name of the surrounding suburb in Broome, Western Australia. Cable Beach was named after the telegraph cable laid between Broome and Java in 1889. Low cliffs of red ochre rise behind the very flat and wide beach, with waves that are mostly gentle in the dry season from May to October. In 2016, the population was 5,436.

Geography 
Gantheaume Point is located at the extreme southern end of the beach. The Gantheaume Point lighthouse is a good place for observing dolphins and migrating whales during their migration seasons. Dinosaur footprints estimated at 130 million years old are visible in the rocks at low tides.

Minyirr Park is located adjacent to the southern section of the beach with walking trails that traverse the area behind the red ochre dunes. The park is a coastal reserve that protects the traditional land of the Yawuru people.

Flora and fauna 
Box jellyfish, also known as stingers, may be present between November and April and caution is required when swimming there during this period. Warning signs are posted on the beach and stingers may be present outside the normal wet season months.

There have been cases where crocodiles have been sighted off the shore occasionally and preventative measures are taken.

Human use 

Cable Beach is home to one of Australia's most famous nudist beaches.

Four-wheel drive vehicles are permitted north of the rocks. This allows people to explore the beach at low tide to a much greater extent than would be possible on foot.

Camel rides are available around sunrise and sunset hours.

The suburb contains a government primary school, Cable Beach Primary School.

References

External links 
 Kimberley region tourism
 Western Australia tourism

Beaches of Western Australia
Suburbs of Broome, Western Australia
Nude beaches